Alexander Kolisko (6 November 1857 – 23 February 1918) was an Austrian pathologist who was born in Vienna. He was the father of anthroposophist Eugen Kolisko (1893–1939).

Biography
In 1881 Kolisko earned his medical doctorate from the University of Vienna, subsequently working as an assistant to Hans Kundrat (1845–1893) at the pathological anatomy institute at the university. Later, he was a prosector at the Leopoldstädter Kinderspital in Vienna. In 1898 he succeeded Eduard von Hofmann (1837–1897) as a professor of forensic medicine, and in 1916 was successor to Anton Weichselbaum (1845–1920) as professor of pathological anatomy at the University of Vienna.

He died in Vienna.

Kolisko is remembered for his work in forensic pathology. He was particularly interested in the pathology of sudden death, leaving the criminal and legal aspects of the subject to his assistant Albin Haberda (1868–1933). Also, he conducted extensive studies involving the effects of carbon monoxide poisoning on the brain, and with obstetrician Carl Breus (1852–1914), he developed a classification system for pelvic disorders.

Selected writings
 Schemata zum Einzeichnen von Gehirnbefunden, Leipzig and Vienna, Verlag Deuticke, 1895 (with Emil Redlich 1866–1930).
 Beiträge zur Kenntnis der osteo myelitis, Vienna, 1896.
 Die pathologischen Beckenformen, Leipzig, 1904 (with Carl Breus 1852–1914).

References

 
 

1857 births
1918 deaths
Austrian pathologists
Scientists from Vienna
Academic staff of the University of Vienna